Vimala Nagar is a village in Mananthavady taluk, Wayanad district, Kerala, India.

Location
Vimala Nagar is a small place in Thavinjal grama panchayat in the Mananthavady thaluk.

Tribal settlements
It is mainly a rural area inhabited by ethnic groups like the Paniyas and Kurumas. There are age old Kurichya families here as well.
Other people from Hinduism and Christianity are the descendants of early migrators from the parts of old Travancore and Malabar.

Economy
95% of the people are agriculturalists.
The main agricultural crops in this area are black pepper, coffee, tea, areca nut palms, banana, etc.

Landmarks

 Schools: St.Thomas U.P.School, Poroor Sarvodayam UP School, Fr.G.K.M.High School, Kaniyaram
 Temples: Aduvat Mahavishnu Temple, Ambalakkolly Muthirery Siva Temple, Muthirery
 Churches: St.Mary's Church, Little Flower Church, Muthirery

Etymology
Vimalanagar is a new name given to the old Thavinhal.

Geography
Hilly terrain, with rivers valleys and paddy fields.

See also 
 Mananthavady 
 Thondernad
 Vellamunda
 Nalloornad
Payyampally
Anjukunnu
Panamaram
Tharuvana
Kallody
Oorpally
Valat
Thrissilery

References

Villages in Wayanad district